Park Avenue Tunnel may refer to:

Park Avenue Tunnel (railroad), a railroad tunnel under Park Avenue in the Upper East Side, in New York City
Park Avenue Tunnel (roadway), a roadway tunnel under Park Avenue South in Murray Hill, in New York City
 Part of the IRT Lexington Avenue Line under Park Avenue, sometimes called the Park Avenue Tunnel

See also 
 Park Avenue (disambiguation) 
 Park Avenue Line (disambiguation)
 Park Avenue Viaduct (disambiguation)
 Park Tunnel (disambiguation)